Kharkiv Oblast is subdivided into districts (raions) which are further subdivided into territorial communities (hromadas).

Current

On 18 July 2020, the number of districts was reduced to seven. These are:
 Bohodukhiv (Богодухівський район), the center is in the town of Bohodukhiv;
 Chuhuiv (Чугуївський район), the center is in the town of Chuhuiv; 
 Izium (Ізюмський район), the center is in the town of Izium;
 Kharkiv (Харківський район), the center is in the city of Kharkiv;
 Krasnohrad (Красноградський район), the center is in the town of Krasnohrad;
 Kupiansk (Куп’янський район), the center is in the town of Kupiansk;
 Lozova (Лозівський район), the center is in the town of Lozova.

Administrative divisions until 2020

Before July 2020, Kharkiv Oblast was subdivided into 32 regions: 25 districts (raions) and 7 city municipalities (mis'krada or misto), officially known as territories governed by city councils.

Cities under the oblast's jurisdiction:
Kharkiv  (Харків), the administrative center of the oblast
Chuhuiv Municipality 
Cities and towns under the city's jurisdiction:
Chuhuiv (Чугуїв) 
Izium (Ізюм)
Kupiansk Municipality 
Cities and towns under the city's jurisdiction:
Kupiansk (Куп'янськ) 
Urban-type settlements under the city's jurisdiction:
Kivsharivka (Ківшарівка)
Kupiansk-Vuzlovyi (Куп'янськ-Вузловий)
Lozova Municipality 
Cities and towns under the city's jurisdiction:
Lozova (Лозова)
Urban-type settlements under the city's jurisdiction:
Paniutyne (Панютине)
Liubotyn Municipality 
Cities and towns under the city's jurisdiction:
Liubotyn (Люботин)
Pervomaiskyi (Первомайський)
Districts (raions):
Balakliia  (Балаклійський район)
Cities and towns under the district's jurisdiction:
Balakliia (Балаклія)
Urban-type settlements under the district's jurisdiction:
Andriivka (Андріївка)
Donets (Донець), formerly Chervonyi Donets
Savyntsi (Савинці)
Barvinkove  (Барвінківський район)
Cities and towns under the district's jurisdiction:
Barvinkove (Барвінкове)
Blyzniuky  (Близнюківський район)
Urban-type settlements under the district's jurisdiction:
Blyzniuky (Близнюки)
Bohodukhiv  (Богодухівський район)
Cities and towns under the district's jurisdiction:
Bohodukhiv (Богодухів)
Urban-type settlements under the district's jurisdiction:
Huty (Гути)
Sharivka (Шарівка)
Borova  (Борівський район)
Urban-type settlements under the district's jurisdiction:
Borova (Борова)
Chuhuiv  (Чугуївський район)
Urban-type settlements under the district's jurisdiction:
Chkalovske (Чкаловське)
Eskhar (Есхар)
Kochetok (Кочеток)
Malynivka (Малинівка)
Novopokrovka (Новопокровка)
Vvedenka (Введенка)
Derhachi  (Дергачівський район)
Cities and towns under the district's jurisdiction:
Derhachi (Дергачі)
Urban-type settlements under the district's jurisdiction:
Kozacha Lopan (Козача Лопань)
Mala Danylivka (Мала Данилівка)
Peresichne (Пересічне)
Prudianka (Прудянка)
Slatyne (Слатине)
Solonytsivka (Солоницівка)
Vilshany (Вільшани)
Dvorichna  (Дворічанський район)
Urban-type settlements under the district's jurisdiction:
Dvorichna (Дворічна)
Izium  (Ізюмський район)
Kehychivka  (Кегичівський район)
Urban-type settlements under the district's jurisdiction:
Kehychivka (Кегичівка)
Slobozhanske (Слобожанське), formerly Chapaeve
Kharkiv  (Харківський район)
Cities and towns under the district's jurisdiction:
Merefa (Мерефа)
Pivdenne (Південне)
Urban-type settlements under the district's jurisdiction:
Babai (Бабаї)
Berezivka (Березівка)
Bezliudivka (Безлюдівка)
Budy (Буди)
Khorosheve (Хорошеве)
Korotych (Коротич)
Kulynychi (Кулиничі)
Manchenky (Манченки)
Pisochyn (Пісочин)
Pokotylivka (Покотилівка)
Rohan (Рогань)
Utkivka (Утківка)
Vasyshcheve (Васищеве)
Vysokyi (Високий)
Kolomak  (Коломацький район)
Urban-type settlements under the district's jurisdiction:
Kolomak (Коломак)
Krasnohrad  (Красноградський район)
Cities and towns under the district's jurisdiction:
Krasnohrad (Красноград)
Krasnokutsk  (Краснокутський район)
Urban-type settlements under the district's jurisdiction:
Kostiantynivka (Костянтинівка)
Krasnokutsk (Краснокутськ)
Kupiansk  (Куп'янський район)
Lozova  (Лозівський район)
Urban-type settlements under the district's jurisdiction:
Krasnopavlivka (Краснопавлівка)
Orilka (Орілька)
Nova Vodolaha  (Нововодолазький район)
Urban-type settlements under the district's jurisdiction:
Birky (Бірки)
Nova Vodolaha (Нова Водолага)
Pechenihy  (Печенізький район)
Urban-type settlements under the district's jurisdiction:
Pechenihy (Печеніги)
Pervomaiskyi  (Первомайський район)
Sakhnovshchyna  (Сахновщинський район)
Urban-type settlements under the district's jurisdiction:
Sakhnovshchyna (Сахновщина)
Shevchenkove  (Шевченківський район)
Urban-type settlements under the district's jurisdiction:
Shevchenkove (Шевченкове)
Valky  (Валківський район)
Cities and towns under the district's jurisdiction:
Valky (Валки)
Urban-type settlements under the district's jurisdiction:
Koviahy (Ков'яги)
Staryi Merchyk (Старий Мерчик)
Velykyi Burluk  (Великобурлуцький район)
Urban-type settlements under the district's jurisdiction:
Prykolotne (Приколотне)
Velykyi Burluk (Великий Бурлук)
Vovchansk  (Вовчанський район)
Cities and towns under the district's jurisdiction:
Vovchansk (Вовчанськ)
Urban-type settlements under the district's jurisdiction:
Bilyi Kolodiaz (Білий Колодязь)
Staryi Saltiv (Старий Салтів)
Vilcha (Вільча)
Zachepylivka  (Зачепилівський район)
Urban-type settlements under the district's jurisdiction:
Zachepylivka (Зачепилівка)
Zmiiv  (Зміївський район)
Cities and towns under the district's jurisdiction:
Zmiiv (Зміїв)
Urban-type settlements under the district's jurisdiction:
Slobozhanske (Слобожанське), formerly Komsomolske
Zidky (Зідьки)
Zolochiv  (Золочівський район)
Urban-type settlements under the district's jurisdiction:
Zolochiv (Золочів)

References

Kharkiv